Vickery Bowles is the City Librarian at the Toronto Public Library.

She is the board vice-chair for the Urban Libraries Council (ULC) based in Washington, D.C., a member of the Canadian Urban Libraries Council (CULC), the Federation of Ontario Public Libraries (FOPL) and the Toronto Region Board of Trade Smart Cities Working Group.

References

Canadian women librarians
Year of birth missing (living people)
Living people
Canadian librarians